Folk Song Favorites is an album by American singer Patti Page. It was released as a 10" long-playing record by Mercury Records, as catalog number MG-25101.  Orchestral accompaniment was directed by Jack Rael.

The album was reissued with 4 additional songs in 1955 as ''Romance on the Range.

Track listing

References 

1951 albums
Patti Page albums
Mercury Records albums
Folk albums by American artists
Covers albums